The Maplewell Group is an Ediacaran lithostratigraphic group (a sequence of rock strata) present in Leicestershire in the English Midlands. The strata are exposed in Charnwood Forest, west of Leicester.  Besides a variety of volcaniclastic sandstones and mudstones, there are various breccias and tuffs. The tuffs which were laid down in water are fossiliferous; Charnia, Charniodiscus and Cyclomedusa, are all recorded from these rocks.

References

Ediacaran geology
Geology of Leicestershire
Geological groups of the United Kingdom